Open House is a 1987 American slasher film written and directed by Jag Mundhra, and co-written by David M. Evans, and starring Joseph Bottoms, Adrienne Barbeau and Mary Stavin.

Plot 
A teenage girl who was molested by her father calls David Kelley, a radio psychologist working for KDRX, and shoots herself on the air. Later, a real estate broker shows off a house to prospective buyers, and discovers the decomposing remains of another realtor in the washroom, the fourth victim of a psychopath dubbed the "Open House Killer". Outside Grant Real Estate, which David's girlfriend Lisa runs, someone digs through the trash, and takes discarded Seller Listings. The vagabond goes to one of the listed houses, and murders the realtor and buyer inside with a plunger that has had razor blades attached to it. The Open House Killer (who gives his name as "Harry") then calls David at KDRX, and opines that his victims deserved their fates.

After an open house, Harry breaks into the property, and electrocutes the realtor with frayed wires. As Harry continues to make rambling calls to KDRX, a detective named Arnold Shapiro is assigned to work with the station to try and track Harry down. In an attempt to protect their employees, the real estate agencies institute new safety precautions, though these do little to deter Harry, who murders another agent by hanging her.

Barney Resnick, Lisa's unscrupulous business rival, visits a prospective client, a dominatrix who agrees to sell her home through his agency if he has kinky sex with her. Harry follows Resnick, decapitates him with an axe, and snaps the neck of the home owner. The next day, Harry abducts Lisa, who gives cryptic hints about her whereabouts when Harry calls KDRX to taunt David. David tracks Lisa and Harry to an empty house, and as the authorities swarm the building, Harry expresses disappointment over the media not being present, and rants about how corporations and the real estate industry drove him to kill, as they made it so he could never have a place he could call his own

Just as Harry is about to slit Lisa's throat, he is shot and knocked through a glass door by Detective Shapiro. Despite the severity of his injuries, Harry still tries attacking, and is finally killed when Shapiro knocks him off a balcony.

Cast 
 Joseph Bottoms as Doctor David Kelley
 Adrienne Barbeau as Lisa Grant
 Mary Stavin as Katie Thatcher
 Rudy Ramos as Rudy Estevez
 Scott Thompson Baker as Joe Pearcy
 Darwyn Swalve as Harry
 Robert Miano as Detective Arnold Shapiro
 Page Moseley as Toby
 Johnny Haymer as Paul Bernal
 Leonard Lightfoot as TJ
 Barry Hope as Barney Resnick
 Stacey Adams as Tracy
 Roxanne Baird as Allison
 Tiffany Bolling as Judy Roberts
 Dena Drotar as The Fan
 Cathryn Hartt as Melody
 Christina Gallegos as Pilar Hernandez
 Lee Moore as Donald Spectre
 Stephen Nemeth as Tommy
 Joanne Norman as Agent #1
 Richard Parnes as Lenny
 Sheila Ryan as Ellen
 A. Gerald Singer as Captain Blake
 Bryan Utman as Policeman
 Susan Widem as Policewoman
 Eddie Wong as Mr. Yoshida

Reception 
Moria gave Open House a zero, and stated that while it was more ambitious than most other slashers of the time and had an intriguing antagonist, it was still "a very poor film" that was dully directed, flatly photographed, and failed to generate any real suspense. Hysteia Lives! found the film "unrelentingly tedious" and gave it a one out of five, writing "Despite a few cheesy flourishes, Open House is a snoozer of the first order".

References

External links 
 
 

1980s slasher films
1987 films
1987 horror films
American independent films
American serial killer films
American slasher films
BDSM in films
Incest in film
Films about radio
Films about psychiatry
Films about homelessness
Films directed by Jag Mundhra
Films set in Los Angeles
Films shot in Los Angeles
Films with screenplays by David Mickey Evans
1980s English-language films
1980s American films